It All Comes Down to This is the first full-length album by hardcore punk band Bane, which focuses lyrically on loss and unity within the hardcore scene.

The album artwork tackled the subject of loss by reproducing photographs taken by journalists who had died in the Vietnam and Indochina wars. The photos have been called both graphically poignant and emotionally and visually thought-provoking.
 

To reinforce this imagery, the band placed mellow musical interludes at certain parts of the album – tracks 3 and 10 – to cause of a sudden mood of reflection before and after the savagery of the hardcore songs which dominate this recording.

The record release show for this album coincided with the Back to School Jam 3 on October 30, 1999 in Worcester, Massachusetts at the Palladium.  The lineup for the show included Right Brigade, Dillinger Escape Plan, Boy Sets Fire, Bane, and Converge.  Patrons attending this show were also able to purchase copies of Saves the Day's just released album Through Being Cool.

"Can We Start Again" was covered in 2013 by the electronicore band I See Stars.

Track listing
All songs written by Bane.
"Fuck What You Heard"  – 2:26
"Struck Down by Me"  – 4:27
"Untitled"  – 0:39
"The Paint Chips Away"  – 1:50
"My Cross to Bear"   – 4:45
"What Makes Us Strong"  – 0:45
"Can We Start Again"  – 3:19
"I Once Was Blind"  – 4:19
"Untitled"  – 0:39
"Place in the Sun"  – 2:44
"Her Lucky Pretty Eyes"  – 3:22
"A Bridge Too Far"  – 4:16

Credits
Bane
 Aaron Bedard – vocals
 Aaron Dalbec – guitar
 Zachary Jordan – guitar 
 Pete Chilton – bass 
 Nick Branigan – drums

Other musicians
Steve Austin – oboe on track 12, vocals on track 8
Kate O Eight – vocals on track 7

Production
 Recorded June 6 – July 6, 1999 at Austin Enterprises, Clinton, Massachusetts, U.S. by Steve Austin
 Mastered by Dave Merullo and Steve Austin at M Works, Cambridge, Massachusetts, U.S.
 Artwork layout by Jacob Bannon
 Inset photography courtesy Requiem: By the photographers who died in Vietnam and Indochina - Random House, New York

External links
Live video of the song "Can We Start Again"

Bane (band) albums
1999 albums
Equal Vision Records albums
Albums with cover art by Jacob Bannon